The 2021 MAAC men's soccer tournament was the postseason men's soccer tournament for the Metro Atlantic Athletic Conference held from November 7 through November 14, 2021. The seven-match tournament took place at campus sites, with the higher seed hosting matches.  The host for the matches was determined by seeding from regular season play.  The eight-team single-elimination tournament consisted of three rounds based on seeding from regular season conference play. The Monmouth were the defending champions and were unable to defend their title, losing to Marist in the semifinals. Marist went on to win the Championship, defeating Rider in a penalty shoot-out in the final.  This is Marist's fourth overall tournament win and first since 2005.  The title is also the first for head coach Matt Viggiano.  As tournament champions, Marist earned the MAAC's automatic berth into the 2021 NCAA Division I men's soccer tournament.

Seeding 

The top eight teams in the regular season earned a spot in the tournament. Teams were seeded based on regular season conference record and tiebreakers were used to determine seedings of teams that finished with the same record.  A tiebreaker was required to determine the fifth and sixth seed as Rider and Fairfield each finished with a 5–4–1 conference record.  Rider earned the fifth seed by virtue of their 4–3 victory over Fairfield on October 20.

Bracket

Source:

Schedule

Quarterfinals

Semifinals

Final

Statistics

Goalscorers

All-Tournament team 

Source:

MVP in Bold

References 

2021 NCAA Division I men's soccer season